Chetan Bist (born 3 September 1989) is an Indian cricketer who plays for Nagaland. He made his List A debut on 2 March 2014, for Rajasthan in the 2013–14 Vijay Hazare Trophy. He made his Twenty20 debut for Rajasthan in the 2017–18 Zonal T20 League on 8 January 2018.

References

External links
 

1989 births
Living people
Indian cricketers
Rajasthan cricketers
Cricketers from Nagpur
Wicket-keepers